Hollywood shootout could refer to:

 Hollywood Shootout, the syndicated title of Shootout (TV series)
 The North Hollywood shootout, between bank robbers and the LAPD in 1997
 North Hollywood Shootout, the Blues Traveler album released in 2008